Wykeham is a small village and civil parish in the Scarborough district of North Yorkshire, England,  on the outskirts of Scarborough and the southern boundary of the North York Moors National Park.

It consists of a main street adjacent to the only pub; The Downe Arms. It has a cricket ground also which is hidden away in a small turning off the main road.

According to the 2011 UK census, Wykeham parish had a population of 280, a decrease on the 2001 UK census figure of 290. In 2015, North Yorkshire County Council estimated that population had remained static at 280.

A nunnery was established at Wykeham between 1140 and 1160 that was located to the south east of the village. The Anglican church in the village is a grade II* listed building. St Helen's and All Saints Parish Church was built between 1853 and 1855 by William Butterfield. A primary school is tied to the church. Wykeham Church of England Primary School, which has a nominal capacity of 60 pupils, was rated Good by Ofsted in 2016.

Charm Park, a Point-to-point racecourse is close by the village, as are the Wykeham Lakes.

See also
 Wykeham Abbey
 Wykeham railway station

References

External links

Villages in North Yorkshire
Civil parishes in North Yorkshire
Borough of Scarborough